The Czech State Award for Translation (Czech language: Státní cena za překladatelské dílo) is an award given by the Ministry of Culture of the Czech Republic. The Czech State Award for Translation is awarded for the  translation of a literary work from a foreign language into Czech. The prize consists of a certificate and 300,000 CZK Czech koruna. It is awarded each year on October 28, along with the Czech State Award for Literature.

Laureates

See also
List of Czech literary awards

References 

Czech literary awards